Manfred Ulbricht (born 9 September 1947) is a German former cyclist. He competed in the team pursuit at the 1968 Summer Olympics.

References

External links
 

1947 births
Living people
East German male cyclists
Olympic cyclists of East Germany
Cyclists at the 1968 Summer Olympics
Cyclists from Saxony
People from Mittelsachsen
People from Bezirk Karl-Marx-Stadt